R Xmas is a 2001 American crime film directed by Abel Ferrara. It was screened in the Un Certain Regard section at the 2001 Cannes Film Festival. Its release was delayed by StudioCanal but it was eventually released on DVD.

Plot
A New York drug dealer is kidnapped and his wife must come up with the money and drugs to free him from his kidnappers before Christmas.

Cast
 Drea de Matteo as The Wife
 Lillo Brancato, Jr. as The Husband
 Lisa Valens as Lisa, the Daughter
 Ice-T as The Kidnapper
 Victor Argo as Louie
 Denia Brache as Louie's Wife
 Gloria Irizarry as Aunt
 Naomi Morales as The Niece
 Nelson Vasquez as Niece's Husband
 Andrew Fiscella as Accomplice No. 1 (as Andy Fiscella)

References

External links
 

2001 films
2001 crime drama films
American Christmas films
American crime drama films
Films directed by Abel Ferrara
Artisan Entertainment films
2000s English-language films
2000s American films